Bahinemo (Gahom) is a Sepik language spoken in East Sepik Province, Papua-New Guinea.

It is spoken in 4 villages, including in Gahom village of Tunap/Hunstein Rural LLG in East Sepik Province.

References

External links 
 Paradisec open access collection of recordings in Bahinemo including stories and histories. 

Bahinemo languages
Languages of East Sepik Province